Zvonimir "Zvonko" Vujin (23 July 1943 – 8 December 2019) was a Serbian amateur boxer. He competed in the 1968 and 1972 Olympics for Yugoslavia and won bronze medals on both occasions. In 1967 he won a silver medal at the European championships and a gold at the Mediterranean Games. He died on 8 December 2019 in his hometown, Zrenjanin.

1968 Olympic results
Below is the Olympic record of Zvonimir Vujin, a Yugoslavian lightweight boxer who competed at the 1968 Mexico City Olympics:

 Round of 64: bye
 Round of 32: defeated Peter Rieger (East Germany) by decision, 3-2
 Round of 16: defeated Valery Belousov (Soviet Union) by decision, 5-0
 Quarterfinal: defeated Luis Minami (Peru) by decision, 5-0
 Semifinal: lost to Josef Grudzien (Poland) by decision, 0-5 (was awarded bronze medal)

1972 Olympic results
Below is the Olympic record of Zvonimir Vujin, a Yugoslavian light welterweight boxer who competed at the 1972 Munich Olympics:

 Round of 32: defeated Robert Mwakosya (Tanzania) by a second-round TKO
 Round of 16: defeated Sodnom Gombo (Mongolia) by decision, 3-2
 Quarterfinal: defeated Graham Moughton (Great Britain) by decision, 5-0
 Semifinal: lost to Ray Seales (United States) by decision, 0-5 (was awarded bronze medal)

References

External links 

 

1943 births
2019 deaths
Serbian male boxers
Boxers at the 1968 Summer Olympics
Boxers at the 1972 Summer Olympics
Olympic boxers of Yugoslavia
Olympic bronze medalists for Yugoslavia
Olympic medalists in boxing
Sportspeople from Zrenjanin
Yugoslav male boxers
Medalists at the 1972 Summer Olympics
Medalists at the 1968 Summer Olympics
Mediterranean Games gold medalists for Yugoslavia
Mediterranean Games bronze medalists for Yugoslavia
Competitors at the 1963 Mediterranean Games
Competitors at the 1967 Mediterranean Games
Mediterranean Games medalists in boxing
Lightweight boxers